Michael Sharpe may refer to:

 Michael Sharpe (cricketer) (born 1966), New Zealand cricketer
 Michael Sharpe (psychiatrist), British psychiatrist
 Michael Sharpe (singer), British singer

See also
 Michael Eugene Sharp (1954–1997), American serial killer 
 Michael William Sharp (1776?–1840), English painter
 Mike Sharpe (disambiguation)